Paraguay competed at the 2014 Summer Youth Olympics, in Nanjing, China from 16 August to 28 August 2014.

Medalists
Medals awarded to participants of mixed-NOC (Combined) teams are represented in italics. These medals are not counted towards the individual NOC medal tally.

Athletics

Paraguay qualified one athlete.

Qualification Legend: Q=Final A (medal); qB=Final B (non-medal); qC=Final C (non-medal); qD=Final D (non-medal); qE=Final E (non-medal)

Girls
Field events

Beach Volleyball

Paraguay qualified a boys' and girls' team from their performance at the 2014 CSV Youth Beach Volleyball Tour.

Equestrian

Paraguay qualified a rider.

Rowing

Paraguay qualified one boat based on its performance at the Latin American Qualification Regatta.

Qualification Legend: FA=Final A (medal); FB=Final B (non-medal); FC=Final C (non-medal); FD=Final D (non-medal); SA/B=Semifinals A/B; SC/D=Semifinals C/D; R=Repechage

Table Tennis

Paraguay was given a quota to compete by the tripartite committee.

Singles

Team

Qualification Legend: Q=Main Bracket (medal); qB=Consolation Bracket (non-medal)

Swimming

Paraguay qualified one swimmer.

Boys

Tennis

Paraguay was given a quota to compete by the tripartite committee.

Singles

Doubles

References

2014 in Paraguayan sport
Nations at the 2014 Summer Youth Olympics
Paraguay at the Youth Olympics